Uiloq Slettemark (born 6 August 1965) is a retired Greenlandic biathlete. She was born in Denmark and has lived in Norway.

Life
Slettemark was born in Varde in 1965.

She is married to Øystein Slettemark who is also a biathlete. Between the two of them they have competed about thirty times in the Arctic Circle Race winning a large number of medals. Uiloq said that she had 14 medals and she might have obtained 15 if she had not been seven months pregnant whilst competing. She has won the race on several occasions. She did not compete in 2012 as she was busy in another event in Greenland.

She competed in the Biathlon World Cup in 2000 and the European (IBU Cup) in 2003.

In 2012, she competed at the Biathlon World Championships 2012 – Women's sprint.

References

1965 births
Living people
People from Varde Municipality
Greenlandic female biathletes
Sportspeople from the Region of Southern Denmark